The Troy Bruins were a professional ice hockey team which played in the All American Hockey League. The team played their home games at Hobart Arena in downtown Troy, Ohio.

History
The organization was formed in 2009 as an expansion franchise in the Northern Junior Hockey League for the 2009–10 season. On May 21, 2009, the team was officially announced as the Troy Bruins. While not being affiliated with the original Troy Bruins from the International Hockey League of the 1950s, the Bruins pay homage to the Miami Valley's first hockey team and the area's rich hockey history. The organization would leave the NJHL after one season and pursued creating a minor league professional team instead.

On August 31, 2010, the team was officially announced as an expansion team in All American Hockey League.

On January 5, 2011, the team officially suspended operations, canceled all remaining games, and released all players. Their final game was a 4-2 win over the Queen City Storm on December 31, 2010. Some of their players were used to create the mid-season replacement team, the Michigan Moose.

Season-by-season records

External links
Official Site
MCP TV official site
Troy5 official site
AAHL official site

Reference list

All American Hockey League (2008–2011) teams
Ice hockey teams in Ohio